ElcomSoft is a privately owned software company headquartered in Moscow, Russia. Since its establishment in 1990, the company has been working on computer security programs, with the main focus on password and system recovery software.

DMCA case

On July 16, 2001, Dmitry Sklyarov, a Russian citizen employed by ElcomSoft who was at the time visiting the United States for DEF CON, was arrested and charged for violating the United States DMCA law by writing ElcomSoft's Advanced eBook Processor software. He was later released on bail and allowed to return to Russia, and the charges against him were dropped. The charges against ElcomSoft were not, and a court case ensued, attracting much public attention and protest. On December 17, 2002, ElcomSoft was found not guilty of all four charges under the DMCA.

Thunder Tables
Thunder Tables is the company's own technology developed to ensure guaranteed recovery of Microsoft Word and Microsoft Excel documents protected with 40-bit encryption. The technology first appeared in 2007 and employs the time–memory tradeoff method to build pre-computed hash tables, which open the corresponding files in a matter of seconds instead of days. These tables take around ~ 4GB. So far, the technology is used in two password recovery programs: Advanced Office Password Breaker and Advanced PDF Password Recovery.

Cracking Wi-Fi passwords with GPUs 
In 2009 ElcomSoft released a tool that takes WPA/WPA2 Hash Codes and uses brute-force methods to guess the password associated with a wireless network.

The advantages of using such methods over the traditional ones, such as rainbow tables, are numerous.

Vulnerability in Canon authentication software 
On November 30, 2010, Elcomsoft announced that the encryption system used by Canon cameras to ensure that pictures and Exif metadata have not been altered was flawed and cannot be fixed. 
On that same day, Dmitry Sklyarov gave a presentation at the Confidence 2.0 conference in Prague demonstrating the flaws.  Among others, he showed an image of an astronaut planting a flag of the Soviet Union on the moon; all the images pass Canon's authenticity verification.

Nude celebrity photo leak
In 2014, an attacker used the Elcomsoft Phone Password Breaker to a guess celebrity Jennifer Lawrence's password and obtain nude photos.  Wired said about Apple's cloud services, "...cloud services might be about as secure as leaving your front door key under the mat."

References 

Software companies established in 1990
Computer law
Cryptography law
Software companies of Russia
Computer security software companies
Companies based in Moscow
Russian companies established in 1990
Cryptographic attacks
Password cracking software